A passenger information system, or passenger information display system, is an automated system for supplying users of public transport with information about the nature and the state of a public transport service through visual, voice or other media. It is also known as a customer information system or an operational information system. Among the information provided by such systems, a distinction can be drawn between:

 Static or schedule information, which changes only occasionally and is typically used for journey planning prior to departure.
 Real-time information, derived from automatic vehicle location systems and changes continuously as a result of real-world events, which is typically used during the course of a journey (primarily how close the service is running to time and when it is due at a stop, as well as incidents that affect service operations, platform changes, etc.).

Static information has traditionally been made available in printed form though route network maps and timetable booklets at transit stations. However, most transit operators now also use integrated passenger information systems that provide either schedule-based information through a journey planner application or schedule-based information in combination with real-time information.

Real-time information is an advance on schedule-only information, which recognises the fact that public transport services do not always operate exactly according to the published timetable. By providing real—time information to travellers, they are better able to conduct their journey confidently, including taking any necessary steps in the event of delays. That helps to encourage greater use of public transport, which for many countries is a political goal.

Real-time information is provided to passengers in a number of different ways, including mobile phone applications, platform-level signage, and automated public address systems. It may include both predictions about arrival and departure times, as well as information on the nature and the cause of disruptions.

Issues with passenger information provision
There are four principal considerations for the provision of passenger information (static or real time):

 Data availability. Information can be provided only if it is available, and collecting information can be resource-intensive. Also, there may be difficulties with co-ordinating data sharing between multiple organisations.
 Data accuracy. Collecting information is error-prone. Also, prediction algorithms are not perfect and so real-time announcements may be in error.
 Getting information to the passenger. A variety of dissemination mechanisms may be used, but it is not always easy to ensure that the correct information reaches the passenger when it is most needed. Information overload must be avoided.
 Latency or response time. Information provision must react quickly to a passenger request or a real-world update. There is little point in announcing a service three minutes after it has departed.

Real-time arrival prediction systems

Current operational information on service running is collected from automatic vehicle location (AVL) systems and from control systems, including incident capture systems. The information can be compared algorithmically with the published service timetable to generate a prediction of how services will run in the next few minutes to hours. That may be informed by additional information. For instance, bus services are affected by congestion on the road network, and all services may be affected by adverse weather conditions.

Economic rationale 
The capital and revenue costs for traveller information systems can be calculated with reasonable accuracy.  However, the derivation of tangible financial benefits is far more difficult to establish and as so there is very little research. That directs the business model for information systems towards the "softer" merits such as traveller confidence. It is worth noting that there must be an actual value, as individuals are willing to pay for systems that give them access to real-time data relating to their journey.  The difficulty is establishing what that is for each individual person and perhaps each individual piece of roadside hardware. Even less is known about the long-term effects of access to these types of services. The only long-term study is from 2012.

Communication channels
Information may be delivered via any electronic media, including:
Mobile phone application
LED displays and screens inside stations
E-paper displays and screens at bus stops and shelters
Internet through a website
Telephone (either a staffed bureau service or an automated answering system)
Touch screen kiosks for self-service (e.g. in customer offices)

Additional considerations include:
How the system presents information for disabled travellers
Whether the system provides information in multiple languages

Information

The information provided by a passenger information system depends on its location and the technical scope (e.g. the size of the display screen)

At a station or stop, it is normal to provide up-to-date predictions of:
Which service is operated by the next vehicle to arrive, including its route and destination.
When the vehicle will arrive.
How closely it is running to timetable.
Similar information for the following few services.
General advice on current travel disruptions that may be useful to the passenger in understanding the implications for their travel plans.

On a vehicle, it is normal to provide up to date predictions of:
When the vehicle will arrive at the next station or stop (express or long-distance services).
Advice on connecting services.

Personalised channels (web, mobile device, or kiosk) is normally set up to mimic the view from a station or stop, but they may in addition be linked to journey planners. Using such systems, a passenger may (re)plan their journey to take into account current circumstances (such as cancelled services or excessive delays).

Examples

France
In Paris, France, SIEL indicator systems (abbreviated from Système d’information en ligne) are installed in the RER, the Paris Métro and on 250 bus routes on the RATP bus system.

On the RER, two types of indicators are used. The first-generation model indicates only the termini of trains stopping at a station through the use of square lights beside the words bearing the name of a terminus. The second-generation model includes an LED display above the square lights indicating the terminus and train service. The displays are used only on the RER line A, RER line B and at Gare de Châtelet – Les Halles station on RER line D. They can be inaccurate at times because of the lack of communication between SNCF and RATP, the two operators of the RER.

On the Paris Métro, there are two types of information display systems. The LED numerical display installed in all Métro lines (except line 14) has been in use since 1997. The television display is installed on all stations on line 14. The displays show the time needed for a train (and the subsequent train after it) to reach a particular station.

On the bus network in Paris, monochrome LCDs have been used since 1996 to indicate the time needed for a bus on a bus route to arrive at a bus stop, after a two-year trial period on a few bus routes.

Germany 

Deutsche Bahn AG offers a Travel Information System ( (RIS)). It shows current train times compared to the published timetable, as well as known delays and expected arrival and departure times of the trains. The information is made available to the train conductor (via SMS) as well as to the passenger via loudspeaker in the train station or schedule boards on the internet. The corresponding VRR and VRS  information systems also process RIS data. The data can also be queried in real-time via mobile devices like mobile phones.

The RIS was started in 2003, and by 2007, it was planned to have 30,000 trains equipped with the necessary train describer (electronic train number). In an accompanying program the older split-flap displays were replaced by electronic dot-matrix signage. Large stations have platform displays with multiple rows, but the Deutsche Bahn network operator developed the Dynamic Font Indicator ( (DSA)) standard system for smaller stations with a single row. In 2011, a federal funding was granted to equip 4500 additional stations with DSA signage, making for most of the 6500 DSAs by 2015.

The federal grant came along with a Federal Railway Authority ( (EBA)) order in 2010 to have all stations connected to the travel information system to announce delays with electronic signage or loudspeakers. The Deutsche Bahn operator tried to block that order legally for stations with a very low frequency but lost all lawsuits in 2015. It was given 18 months to equip the remaining stations with DSAs. The DSA system has a GSM radio module to receive a text message to be displayed in a horizontally-moving news ticker style. A loudspeaker may optionally be mounted on top. When there is no delay, the current time is shown statically on its 96×8 LED dot-matrix display.

United Kingdom 
National Rail stations are equipped with visual platform displays and audio announcements, which indicate the next service or services from the platform and warn passengers to stand clear of trains that are not scheduled to stop, not in use or are about to depart. Additionally, concourses and ticket offices have large screen displays that show all of the services available at the station for the next hour or more and, at major stations, the full route of the service and any restrictions applicable (e.g. ticket types, catering services, bicycle carriage). Many smaller and less well-used railway stations have, instead of such systems, "passenger help points", which connect the user by telephone to a control room by pressing an "Information" button.

The information is available online at National Rail and on mobile devices.

Most London Underground stations have “countdown” displays on each platform. They are simpler than the national rail displays since most platforms serves only a single line, and there are few or no variations in carriage restrictions and destinations served. Audio announcements are also made regularly.

Local authorities and some transport operators provide electronic versions of the bus timetables to the Traveline information service, which covers all public transport modes, and from there to other information services such as Transport Direct, and Google Transit.

The deployment of real-time bus information systems is a gradual process and currently extends to around half of the national fleet and a high proportion of town-centre stops but relatively few suburban and rural locations. The first use of such systems was in Brighton and Hove. The Traveline NextBuses information service provides the next departures from any bus stop in the UK, and some trams as well. The information has the real-time feed that has been connected in; otherwise, the scheduled times are given.

The government-sponsored Transport Direct project provided journey planning across all transport modes (including private car) and was increasingly linked to real-time information systems prior to its discontinuation in 2014.

United States

Real-time passenger information was brought to riders in the US by NextBus corporation, a small start-up, in 1999. The first systems were installed in Emeryville, California, and later in San Francisco, California. , both initial systems are still in operation.

The Washington Metro installed a passenger information display system (PIDS) in all of its stations in 2000. The system provides real-time information on next train arrivals, delayed trains, emergency announcements, and related information. Metro also provides current train and related information to customers with conventional web browsers, as well as users of smartphones and other mobile devices. In 2010, Metro began sharing its PIDS data with outside software developers for use in creating additional real-time applications for mobile devices. Free apps are available to the public on major mobile device software platforms (iPhone/iPad, Android, Windows Phone, Palm). The system also began providing real-time train information by phone in 2010.

The New York City Subway began installing its public address/customer information screens, commonly known as "countdown clocks", in its stations in 2007. In 2012, the system began offering SubTime, a website and iPhone app for real-time train arrival estimates for several of its subway services, and the arrival data are shared with outside software developers to support creation of additional apps. There are also PIDS installed on some MTA Regional Bus Operations routes over the years, but mostly, the MTA offers real-time bus tracking through another website/app called MTA Bus Time.

The Boston MBTA Red, Orange, and Blue Lines introduced countdown locks in early 2014, and the Green Line introduced them the following year. The eastern end of the Green Line introduced clocks in early 2016. They  reflect how many "stops away" the train is, rather than how many minutes it will take to arrive. Amtrak has deployed PIDS throughout the Northeast Corridor.

, PIDS are being deployed with unified messaging, which can include information streamed to mobile devices, phones and translated directly to voice announcements. Text to Speech products have been designed to convert PIDS data to speech in a choice of over 20 languages.

See also
 General Transit Feed Specification
 Identification of Fixed Objects in Public Transport (IFOPT)
 IEEE Intelligent Transportation Systems Society
 Journey planner
 Platform display
 Real Time Information Group (RTIG), UK organisation
 Service Interface for Real Time Information (SIRI), technical specifications and standards
 Transmodel, CEN European Reference Data Model

References

Travel technology